Czesławice may refer to the following places in Poland:
Czesławice, Lower Silesian Voivodeship (south-west Poland)
Czesławice, Lublin Voivodeship (east Poland)
Czesławice, Ostrów Wielkopolski County in Greater Poland Voivodeship (west-central Poland)
Czesławice, Wągrowiec County in Greater Poland Voivodeship (west-central Poland)